Abdul Rahim Khan Mandokhail (12 January 1937 – 20 May 2017) was a Pakistani politician who had been a member of the National Assembly of Pakistan, the Provincial Assembly of Balochistan, and the Senate of Pakistan.

Early life and education
Abdul Rahim Khan Mandokhail was born on 12 January 1937 in the village of Omza Mir Hussain Zai of Fort Sandeman, British India (present-day Zhob, Pakistan). According to some reports, he was born on 15 June 1932.

He obtained degrees in Bachelor of Arts and Bachelor of Law.

Political career

He served as a member of the Senate of Pakistan from 1991 to 1997.

He was elected to the Provincial Assembly of Balochistan in 1997 Pakistani general election.

He was re-elected to the Senate of Pakistan on general seat as Pashtunkhwa Milli Awami Party candidate in 2006 where he served until 2012.

He was elected as the member of the National Assembly on a ticket of Pashtunkhwa Milli Awami Party from NA-260 (Quetta) in 2013 Pakistani general election.

He served as senior deputy chairman of Pashtunkhwa Milli Awami Party from 1989 until his death on 20 May 2017 in Quetta.

References

1932 births
2017 deaths
Politicians from Quetta
Pashtunkhwa Milli Awami Party politicians
Pakistani MNAs 2013–2018